CSS Alabamas South Atlantic Expeditionary Raid commenced shortly after the Confederate States Navy ship  left Haiti and the Caribbean Sea and cruised south toward Brazil in the south Atlantic Ocean. The raid lasted from about the beginning of February 1863 to the end of July 1863.

The primary area of operation during this expeditionary raid, was the Atlantic seaboard of South America starting from the northern end of Brazil then ranging up down along the Brazilian coast before finally heading east toward southern Africa.

Raid overview
CSS Alabama worked its way slowly down the east coast of Brazil in the most devastating of its seven raids, capturing or burning dozens of enemy Yankee vessels.

From this raiding area off the coast of Brazil, CSS Alabama made its way into the Indian Ocean by way of the Cape of Good Hope to continue its unhindered wrecking of enemy commerce in the Indian Ocean as far as Indonesia.

Raid bounty

References
 Hearn, Chester G., Gray Raiders of the Sea, Louisiana State Press, 1996. 
 Howe and Matthews, American Clipper Ships 1833 - 1858 Volume I, Dover Publications, 1986. 
 Luraghi, Raimondo, A History of the Confederate Navy, U.S. Naval Institute Press, 1996. 

South Atlantic Expeditionary Raid